Escadron de Transition Opérationnelle 1/8 Saintonge is a French Air and Space Force (Armée de l'air et de l'espace) Operational Transition Squadron located at Cazaux Air Base, Gironde, France which operates the Dassault/Dornier Alpha Jet.

See also

 List of French Air and Space Force aircraft squadrons

References

French Air and Space Force squadrons